Cacareco  (1954-1962) was a female black rhinoceros exhibited in Brazilian zoos. She is known for receiving many votes in the 1958 São Paulo city council elections as a form of protest vote. Electoral officials did not accept Cacareco's candidacy, but she eventually won 100,000 votes, more than any other party in that same election (which was also marked by rampant absenteeism). 

Cacareco's candidacy inspired the Rhinoceros Party of Canada, nominally led by the rhinoceros Cornelius the First.

Cacareco's candidacy also inspired a very popular 1960 Carnival song.

History 
Cacareco was born in 1954, at the Jardim Zoológico do Rio de Janeiro. She was the daughter of rhinoceroses Britador and Terezinha. In 1958 she was loaned for three months, on the occasion of the opening of São Paulo Zoo. In that year there were elections being held for the city council. Journalist Itaboraí Martins, displeased with the candidates' level, proposed the name of Cacareco as a write-in candidate.

Cacareco was returned to Rio de Janeiro two days before the elections, where she received 100,000 votes. She was also exhibited at Porto Alegre in 1962, before dying in the same year.

References 

Animals in politics
History of São Paulo
1958 in Brazil
1958 in politics
Individual animals in Brazil

Individual rhinoceroses
1954 animal births
1962 animal deaths